Vivo X Note is an Android-based phablet developed and manufactured by Vivo. This phone announced on 11 April 2022.

References 

Android (operating system) devices
Mobile phones introduced in 2022
Phablets
Vivo smartphones
Flagship smartphones